"Quelle Surprise" is a single by British rock band Enter Shikari, released on 19 May 2011. It was originally planned to be the first single released from the band's third studio album A Flash Flood of Colour. However, Rou Reynolds later confirmed that it would not feature, and instead will be a stand-alone single much like the previous single "Destabilise". The song was first played live at the SXSW Festival on 18 March 2011 in Austin, Texas. The track's debut airing was on 19 May 2011 Zane Lowe's BBC Radio 1 show, he chose the track for the "Hottest Record In the World" spot.

The single was released on iTunes shortly after being played on Zane's show. The single comes with 3 b-sides, 2 of them being remixes of "Destabilise", one by Reynolds' side project ROUT and the other by London artists Creatures of Love. The other b-side being a live recording of "Hectic" from the Enter Shikari Christmas party featuring Matty P. It was announced that on 11 July 2011 that this EP would be released as a limited edition 2 7" vinyl set (one will be red, the other will be white).

The song was eventually included on A Flash Flood of Colour as a bonus track on the iTunes version of the album in the UK and Ireland. The same edition of the album also included the previous stand alone single "Destabilise" as a bonus track, as well.

Track listing

Personnel
Enter Shikari
 Rou Reynolds - vocals, electronics
 Rory Clewlow - guitar, background vocals
 Chris Batten - bass, background vocals
 Rob Rolfe - drums, background vocals

Production
Dan Weller - production, mixing

Charts

References

2011 singles
Enter Shikari songs
Electronicore songs
Wikipedia requested audio of songs